Clypeomorus is a genus of sea snails, marine gastropod mollusks in the subfamily Cerithiinae of the  family Cerithiidae.

Distribution
The species of this marine genus occurs in the Indo-West Pacific, from the Red Sea to the Marshall Islands: off Australia (New South Wales, Northern Territory, Queensland and Western Australia)

Species
Species within the genus Clypeomorus include:
 Clypeomorus admirabilis Houbrick, 1985
 Clypeomorus adunca (Gould, 1849)
 † Clypeomorus alasaensis Wissema, 1947 
 Clypeomorus batillariaeformis Habe & Kosuge, 1966
 Clypeomorus bifasciata (G.B. Sowerby II, 1855)
 Clypeomorus brevis (Quoy & Gaimard, 1834)
 Clypeomorus inflata (Quoy & Gaimard, 1834)
 Clypeomorus irrorata (Gould, 1849)
 Clypeomorus isselii (Pagenstecher, 1877)
 Clypeomorus nympha Houbrick, 1985
 Clypeomorus pellucida (Hombron & Jacquinot, 1852)
 Clypeomorus petrosa (Wood, 1828)
 Clypeomorus purpurastoma Houbrick, 1985
 Clypeomorus subbrevicula (Oöstingh, 1925)
 † Clypeomorus tjilonganensis (K. Martin, 1899) 
 † Clypeomorus verbeekii (Woodward, 1880)
Species brought into synonymy
 Clypeomorus bifasciatum [sic]: synonym of Clypeomorus bifasciatus (G.B. Sowerby II, 1855)
 Clypeomorus caeruleum (G.B. Sowerby II, 1855): synonym of Cerithium caeruleum G.B. Sowerby II, 1855
 Clypeomorus chemnitziana (Pilsbry, 1901): synonym of Clypeomorus petrosa chemnitziana (Pilsbry, 1901)
 Clypeomorus clypeomorus Jousseaume, 1888: synonym of Clypeomorus bifasciatus (G.B. Sowerby II, 1855)
 Clypeomorus concisus (Hombron & Jacquinot, 1852): synonym of Clypeomorus bifasciatus (G.B. Sowerby II, 1855)
 Clypeomorus coralium (Kiener, 1841): synonym of Cerithium coralium Kiener, 1841
 Clypeomorus gennesi (H. Fischer & Vignal, 1901): synonym of Clanculus tonnerrei (G. Nevill & H. Nevill, 1874)
 Clypeomorus moniliferus (Kiener, 1841): synonym of Clypeomorus batillariaeformis Habe & Kosuge, 1966
 Clypeomorus morus (Lamarck, 1822): synonym of Clypeomorus bifasciatus (G.B. Sowerby II, 1855)
 Clypeomorus penthusarus Iredale, 1929: synonym of Clypeomorus bifasciatus (G.B. Sowerby II, 1855)
 Clypeomorus petrosa (Wood, 1828): synonym of Clypeomorus petrosa petrosa (Wood, 1828)
 Clypeomorus traillii (G.B. Sowerby II, 1855): synonym of Cerithium traillii G.B. Sowerby II, 1855
 Clypeomorus tuberculatus (Linnaeus, 1767): synonym of Cerithium tuberculatum (Linnaeus, 1767)
 Clypeomorus zonatus (Wood, 1828): synonym of Cerithium zonatum (Wood, 1828)

References

 Jousseaume, F. 1888. Description des Mollusques Recueillis par M. Le Dr. Faurot dans la Mer Rouge et le Golfe D'Aden. Mémoires de la Société Zoologique de France 1(42): 166-223 
 Houbrick R.S. 1985. Genus Clypeomorus Jousseaume (Cerithiidae: Prosobranchia). Smithsonian Contributions to Zoology 403: 1-131
 Wilson, B. 1993. Australian Marine Shells. Prosobranch Gastropods. Kallaroo, Western Australia : Odyssey Publishing Vol. 1 408 pp.
 Gofas, S.; Le Renard, J.; Bouchet, P. (2001). Mollusca, in: Costello, M.J. et al. (Ed.) (2001). European register of marine species: a check-list of the marine species in Europe and a bibliography of guides to their identification. Collection Patrimoines Naturels, 50: pp. 180–213
  Houbrick R.S. 1985. Genus Clypeomorus Jousseaume (Cerithiidae: Prosobranchia). Smithsonian Contributions to Zoology 403: 1-131

External links
   Houbrick R.S. 1985. Genus Clypeomorus Jousseaume (Cerithiidae: Prosobranchia). Smithsonian Contributions to Zoology 403: 1-131

 
Cerithiidae
Gastropod genera